Hopkins Farm may refer to:

Hopkins Farm (Cherry Hills Village, Colorado)
Hopkins Farm (Pittsford, New York)
Hopkins Farm (Simpsonville, South Carolina), a National Register of Historic Places listingin Greenville County, South Carolina

See also
Hopkins Covered Bridge Farm, Lewes, Delaware, a National Register of Historic Places listing in Sussex County, Delaware
Rider–Hopkins Farm and Olmsted Camp, Sardinia, New York
Hopkins Sandstone House and Farmstead, Ripley, Oklahoma, a National Register of Historic Places listing in Payne County, Oklahoma
Hopkins House (disambiguation)